August Karl Silberstein (1 July 1827 – 7 March 1900) was an Austrian writer, born in Ofen, Budapest (Hungary).

Biography 
Silberstein was educated at the University of Vienna and supported the 1848 revolts in Austria-Hungary with his articles in the German satire periodical Leuchtkugeln, which was banned in the middle of 1851. As a result, Silberstein was forced to leave his home.

Impassioned by the country life, he wrote stories of life in villages idealizing the countryside and published popular collections of tales. He was thus called the "Austrian Auerbach". His poems had influence in his lifetime, in particular upon the Austrian poet Peter Rosegger, to whom he was to some extent a mentor. These poems were sometimes put to music by composers such as Strauss (Wenn du ein herzig Liebchen hast of 1879) or Anton Bruckner (Germanenzug of 1864, Vaterlandslied of 1866, and Helgoland of 1893).

Works
Dorfschwalben aus Österreich (1862-1863)
Hercules Schwach (1864)
Land u. Leute im Nasswald (1868)
Glänzende Bahnen (1874)
Die Alpenrose von Ischl (1875)
Deutsche Hochlandsgeschichten (1877)
Büchlein Klinginsland (1878)
Denksäulen im Gebiet der Kultur und Litteratur (1878)
Die Rosenzauberin (1884)
Hauschronik im Blumen— u. Dichter-Schmuck (1884)
Frau Sorge (1886)
Landläufige Geschichten (1886)
Dorfmusik (1892)

See also

Revolutions of 1848
Ferdinand Freiligrath
Ludwig Kalisch
Gottfried Kinkel

References
August Karl Silberstein at the Encyclopedia of Austria
Portrait, at portrait.kaar.at
stadtbibliothek.wien.at
Leuchtkugeln,  München/Quedlinburg 1847–1851,

Notes 

1827 births
1900 deaths
People from Buda
Hungarian Jews
19th-century Austrian writers
Austrian male short story writers
Austrian satirists
19th-century Austrian poets
Austro-Hungarian writers
Austro-Hungarian Jews
19th-century Hungarian poets
19th-century short story writers
19th-century Hungarian male writers
Austrian male poets